Kårhamn is a small fishing village in Hammerfest Municipality in Troms og Finnmark county, Norway.  The village is located on an isolated peninsula on the northwestern tip of the large island of Seiland.  The village has roads in it, but none of them are connected to the rest of Norway, so boat access to the village is required.  Kårhamn was a part of the former municipality of Sørøysund, but since 1992 it has been part of Hammerfest Municipality.

Kårhamn has a population of about 50 people, where most are employed in the "LeanFish AS" fish processing plant. The village also has a small school, kindergarten, and a grocery store with a post office in it. The grocery store has also recently begun to function as a small library, taking over this service from the school.

See also
List of villages in Finnmark

References

Hammerfest
Populated places of Arctic Norway
Villages in Finnmark